The 1946 Lincoln Blue Tigers football team was an American football team that represented Lincoln University of Missouri in the Midwest Athletic Association (MAA) during the 1946 college football season. In their second year under head coach David D. Rains, the Tigers compiled a 5–3–1 record (1–1–1 against MAA opponents), defeated Lane in the Mule Bowl on Armistice Day, lost to Prairie View A&M in the Prairie View Bowl on New Year's Day, and outscored all opponents by a total of 60 to 57.  

In December 1946, The Pittsburgh Courier applied the Dickinson System to the black college teams and rated Lincoln at No. 7. 

The team played its home games at Lincoln Field in Jefferson City, Missouri.

Schedule

References

Lincoln
Lincoln Blue Tigers football seasons
Lincoln Blue Tigers football